The following elections occurred in the year 1897.

Africa

Liberia
 1897 Liberian general election

Asia

The Philippines
 1897 Philippine Supreme Council elections

Europe

Austria-Hungary  
 Election of the Imperial Council (Austria) → :de:Reichsratswahl 1897
 Cisleithanian legislative election

Croatia
 1897 Croatian parliamentary election

The Netherlands
 1897 Dutch general election

Italy
 1897 Italian general election

Norway
 1897 Norwegian parliamentary election

Portugal
 1897 Portuguese legislative election

North America

Canada
 1897 Edmonton municipal election
 1897 Newfoundland general election
 1897 Nova Scotia general election
 1897 Quebec general election

United States
 1897 New York state election
 United States Senate special election in South Carolina, 1897
 United States Senate election in New York, 1897

Oceania

Australia
 1897 Western Australian colonial election

New Zealand
 1897 Awarua by-election
 1897 City of Dunedin by-election
 1898 Mataura by-election
 1897 Wellington Suburbs by-election

See also
 :Category:1897 elections

1897
Elections